Marcos García Barreno (born 21 March 1987), known as Marquitos, is a Spanish professional footballer who plays for CD Ibiza Islas Pitiusas as a midfielder.

Club career
Born in Sant Antoni de Portmany, Ibiza, Balearic Islands, Marquitos was a product of Villarreal CF's youth system, and he made his first-team debut on 24 September 2006 in a 3–2 home win against Real Zaragoza. During the season he was an important attacking weapon for the fifth-placed side in La Liga and, in two starts, scored goals in home victories over Real Madrid (1–0) and FC Barcelona (2–0), playing 90 minutes on both occasions.

However, Marquitos would be loaned for 2007–08 to Recreativo de Huelva also in the top division, where he only appeared in half of the campaign's matches, with a goal against Real Murcia (4–2 home win). He returned to Villarreal only to be immediately loaned again, to Segunda División's Real Sociedad; he featured heavily during this spell, but the Basque team failed to achieve a top-flight return.

In late July 2009, Villarreal released Marquitos, whom immediately signed a four-year contract with top-tier Real Valladolid as well as former teammate César Arzo. On 17 October he netted again against Real Madrid, albeit in a 4–2 away defeat, but appeared sparingly throughout the season as the Castile and León side was eventually relegated.

Marquitos returned to Villarreal in the summer of 2010, on loan, but was assigned to the reserve squad in division two. He continued competing at that level the following years, with Xerez CD, SD Ponferradina and CE Sabadell FC.

In 2015 off-season, aged 28, Marquitos moved abroad for the first time, joining Polish club Miedź Legnica. The following January, he moved to the country's Ekstraklasa with GKS Górnik Łęczna.

In September 2016, Marquitos moved to the First Professional Football League (Bulgaria) with PFC Beroe Stara Zagora. He was released in December, and returned to Miedź.

Career statistics

Club

References

External links

1987 births
Living people
Spanish footballers
Footballers from Ibiza
Association football midfielders
La Liga players
Segunda División players
Segunda División B players
Tercera División players
Segunda Federación players
Villarreal CF B players
Villarreal CF players
Recreativo de Huelva players
Real Sociedad footballers
Real Valladolid players
Xerez CD footballers
SD Ponferradina players
CE Sabadell FC footballers
UD Melilla footballers
Ekstraklasa players
I liga players
Miedź Legnica players
Górnik Łęczna players
First Professional Football League (Bulgaria) players
PFC Beroe Stara Zagora players
Spain youth international footballers
Spanish expatriate footballers
Expatriate footballers in Poland
Expatriate footballers in Bulgaria
Spanish expatriate sportspeople in Poland
Spanish expatriate sportspeople in Bulgaria